

Technical colleges
 College of Health Technology
 Technical College, Baghdad
 Technical College, Basrah
 Technical College, Kirkuk
 Technical College, Mosayyab
 Technical College, Mosul
 Technical College, Najaf
 Technical College of Electricity
 Technical College for Management

Technical institutes
 Technical Institute, Al Mansour
 Technical Institute, Zakho 
 Technical Institute, Basrah
 Technical Institute, Ninawa
 Technical Institute, Mosul
 Technical Institute, Najaf
 Technical Institute, Kerbala 
 Technical Institute, Amarah 
 Technical Institute, Nasiriyah 
 Technical Institute, Diwaniyah 
 Technical Institute, Al Dur
 Technical Institute, Baquba 
 Technical Institute, Hawija 
 Technical Institute, Kufa 
 Technical Institute Al Suwaira 
 Technical Institute, Ramadi 
 Management Institute, Rusafa 
 Technical Institute, Shatrah 
 Technical Institute, Musayyib 
 Technical Institute, Samawah 
 Technical Institute, Kut
 Technical Management Institute 
 Technical Institute, Babel 
 Technical Institute, Kirkuk 
 Medical Technical Institute
 Teacher Training Institute 
 Baghdad Technology Institute
 Institute of Applied Arts

See also
 Foundation of Technical Education

References

Technical colleges and institutes
Technical universities and colleges